Frank J. Skinner (April 6, 1891 – ?) was a National Football League player. He played in only one NFL game during the 1922 season for the Evansville Crimson Giants.

External links
Frank Skinner at Database Football
Profootballarchives.com

1891 births
Year of death missing
Sportspeople from Montreal
Sportspeople from Quebec
American football offensive linemen
Canadian players of American football
Evansville Crimson Giants players